Francisco Urroz Martínez (14 December 1920 – 22 January 1992) was a Chilean football defender.

Club career
Urroz played for Unión Española, becoming team captain and won the 1947 Primera División de Chile along with Colo-Colo.

International career
Urroz made 11 appearances for the Chile national team, playing also in the 1950 FIFA World Cup.

Personal life
Urroz was born in Higuerote, Venezuela. He died in Concón on 22 January 1992, at the age of 71. He was the father of the tennis player Silvana Urroz and grandfather of both the field hockey player Manuela Urroz - who also played football at youth categories for Unión Española - and the rugby union player and doctor Francisco Urroz.

Honours
Unión Española
Primera División (1): 1943

Colo-Colo
Primera División (1): 1947

References

External links

Francisco Urroz at playmakerstats.com (English version of ceroacero.es)

1920 births
1992 deaths
People from Miranda (state)
Naturalized citizens of Chile
Chilean footballers
Chile international footballers
Association football defenders
Unión Española footballers
Colo-Colo footballers
Chilean Primera División players
1950 FIFA World Cup players
Venezuelan emigrants to Chile